Zorica McCarthy was the Australian High Commissioner to Pakistan (2004–2006) who was investigated "buying discounted shares in the failed fuel technology company Firepower (and) has been found guilty of breaching the rules but forgiven because the breach was unintentional". McCarthy was accredited as non-resident Ambassador to Afghanistan.  McCarthy was also Ambassador to Spain from January 2010 to January 2013.

Firebrand investigation

McCarthy bought shares in Firebrand 14 days after Firebrand and a Pakistani company signed an agreement at a ceremony she organised and was witnessed by Australia's former prime minister John Howard and Pakistan's former prime minister Shaukat Aziz.

Personal life
McCarthy has two daughters with ex-husband John McCarthy.

References

High Commissioners of Australia to Pakistan
Ambassadors of Australia to Spain
Ambassadors of Australia to Afghanistan
Australian women ambassadors